Cuerden is a civil parish in the Borough of Chorley, Lancashire, England.   The parish contains four buildings that are recorded in the National Heritage List for England as designated listed buildings. Of these, one is listed at Grade II*, the middle grade, and the others are at Grade II, the lowest grade.  The major building in the parish is Cuerden Hall; this and two structures associated with it are listed.  The other listed building is a farmhouse.

Key

Buildings

References

Citations

Sources

Lists of listed buildings in Lancashire
Buildings and structures in the Borough of Chorley